Jordy Rafael Jiménez Arrobo (born 11 February 1994) is an Ecuadorian racewalking athlete. He represented Ecuador at the 2020 Summer Olympics in the men's 20 kilometres walk.

Career
In June 2021, Jiménez represented Ecuador during the Spanish leg of the World Race Walking Challenge where finished in 10th place with a personal best time of 1:20:47.

In August 2021, Jiménez represented Ecuador at the 2020 Summer Olympics in the men's 20 kilometres walk and finished in 35th place with a time of 1:27:52.

References

1994 births
Living people
Ecuadorian male racewalkers
Athletes (track and field) at the 2020 Summer Olympics
Olympic athletes of Ecuador
21st-century Ecuadorian people